Bridal Veil Falls is a waterfall near the town of Kagawong on Lake Huron's Manitoulin Island, Ontario, Canada. The water source is the Kagawong River, which flows from Lake Kagawong to the North Channel of Lake Huron.

There is a short hiking trail from the falls down to the North Channel.

There are two parking lots and two approaches to the falls: one from the top of the outdoor steel staircase next to the falls, and another from a few hundred metres down the trail, past some of the rapids.  Both are easily accessible from Highway 540.

References

External links

Waterfalls of Ontario
Landforms of Manitoulin District
Tourist attractions in Manitoulin District
Manitoulin Island